Senichkin is a rural locality (a khutor) in Mikhaylovka Urban Okrug, Volgograd Oblast, Russia. The population was 265 as of 2010. There are 9 streets.

Geography 
Senichkin is located 28 km west of Mikhaylovka. Zinovyev is the nearest rural locality.

References 

Rural localities in Mikhaylovka urban okrug